Wojciech Maciej Romaniuk (born 20 January 1970 in Biała Podlaska) is a Polish politician. He was elected to the Sejm on 25 September 2005, getting 10719 votes in 7 Chełm district as a candidate from the Samoobrona Rzeczpospolitej Polskiej list.

See also
Members of Polish Sejm 2005-2007

External links
Wojciech Romaniuk - parliamentary page - includes declarations of interest, voting record, and transcripts of speeches.

1970 births
Living people
People from Biała Podlaska
Members of the Polish Sejm 2005–2007
Self-Defence of the Republic of Poland politicians